Ola-Dele Kuku (8 August 1963 – 11 October 2021) was a Nigerian architect and artist of Yoruba origin. He lived and worked between Nigeria and Belgium.

Formation and career 
He also attended Architecture Intermundium in Milan, Italy, (1988 - 1990), for advanced architecture studies, where he collaborated with Daniel Libeskind on the City Edge project (Berlin), and the Berlin Jewish Museum competition.

Neglecting the end capabilities to itself, Kuku is quite fascinated by the study of proportion and create structures between the visible and the imaginary dialogue that put in the physical with the idea of empty space revolutionizing the common conception of living space and challenging traditional architecture dictates.

At this immaterial production Kuku also having more works related to the subject such as "Opera Domestica" a series consisting of furniture wooden sculpture that condense the structures and functions of architectural space in the object space.

Awards and prizes 
Ola-Dele Kuku has successfully participated in numerous events and international competitions such as:

 ’Grand Prize - Prime Minister’s Prize' Award - IFI Nagoya International Design Competition, Nagoya, Japan, 1995
 ’License of Honour' Tech-Art Prize Award -   Vlaamse Ingenieurs kamer, Antwerp, Belgium, 1995
 Henry Van De Velde Prize - 'Prize of the Public Award'  - VIZO at the Design Museum, Ghent, Belgium, 1997
 ‘Honourable Mention’ Award - Nagoya Do International Design Competition, Nagoya Japan, 1998
 ’Mention Spéciale pour la Créativité' -  Biennale pour l'Art Contemporain Africain Dak'ART, Dakar Senegal 2000
 Lauréat - SPES Belgian Foundation Scholarship Award (for artistic creation), Brussels Belgium.

Exhibitions 
 Politecnico di Milano, Italy (dept of Architecture) –'Home for the Muses’ (curator: Prof Remo Dorigati) 1990 - solo
 Nagoya Center, Nagoya, Japan – ‘Teatro Dell'Archivio’ (curator: Julia Chiu) 1995 - group·
 Lineart (International Art Fair 20th Century) . Ghent, Belgium – ‘Teatro Dell'Archivio’ (curator: Martine Boucher) 1996 – solo
 Richard Foncke Gallery, Ghent, Belgium – ‘Circumstances as Consequence’ (curator Richard Foncke) 1997 - solo
 World Craft Council, Hannover, Germany (Artistry in Wood) – ‘Objects’ (curator : Inge Vranken)1997 - group
 Centre d’Art Contemporain Brussels, Belgium – ‘Detail’ (curator: Martine Boucher) 1998 - group
 Nagoya Centre, Nagoya, Japan – ‘New Neighbours’ (Similar Differences) 1999 - group
 Röhsska Museum, Gothenburg, Sweden – World Crafts Council European Prize (Fossils & Icons) 1999 - group
 Musée des Arts Décoratifs, Paris, France – World Crafts Council European Prize (Fossils & Icons) 1999 - group
 Temporary & Contemporary TenT Brussels, Belgium – ‘Celestial Mechanics I – VIII’ (curator Philippe Braems)1999 solo
 International Biennial Design Festival, Sainte-Etienne, France – ‘Detail’ 2000 – group
 Narodni Techniké Museum, Prague, Czech Republic – ‘Similar Differences’ (curator: Martine Boucher) 2000 - group
 Teatro dal Verme Milano, Italy (Donation for Child Care Trust) – ‘Aftermath’ (curator : Victor Kanu) 2001 - solo
 Middelheim Museum Antwerp Belgium – ‘Experimental Experience’ (curator : Nij De Donker) 2004 - solo.
 Swish Art Fair Milan, Italy (Montenapoleone Art Shop) – ‘Objects & Drawings’ (curator : Vilma Redis) 2004 - group.
 Porsche Haus Milan, Italy – ‘Objects & Drawings’ (curator Victor Kanu) 2004 - solo.
 Torino Art Fair, Torino, Italy – ‘Living with the Fates I-XII’ (curator : Grazia Chiasa - Fondazion D’Ars) 2004 – group.
 Galleria Mares, Pavia, Italy – ‘Ola-Dele Kuku Architect’ (curator : Maria-Angela Callisti) 2004 - solo.
 Milan Art Fair 2005 - MIART off (Spazio CIN ) – ‘Ola-Dele Kuku Prototype’ (curator : Claudio Composti) 2005 - solo.
 Galleria Luisa delle Piane, Milan, Italy – ‘Selected works’ (curator : Luisa delle Piane) 2006 - solo.
 Musée d’Ixelles Brussels, Belgium - (Art et Histoire1906 à nos jours) ’Agenda Setting’ (curator: Martine Boucher) 2008.
 FESMAN III, Dakar, Senegal ‘The Dakar Initiative’ (documentary video on visual culture) 2010 - solo.
 Philippe Laeremans Gallery Brussels, Belgium - ‘Speaking in Vernacular’ (exhibition and book launch) 2012 - solo.
 Design museum Gent, Belgium - ‘Similar Difference’ Installation - (curator : Bernadette De Loose) 2012 - solo.
 7th Flanders Design Triennial, Genk, Belgium - ‘Agenda Setting’ - (curator : Kurt Vanbelleghem) 2013 - group
 Nigerian Pavilion - 15th International Architecture Exhibition, 'Diminished Capacity' - (curator : Camilla Boemio)

Architecture institutions 
Ola-Dele Kuku has lectured and offered seminars at several architecture academies.
 Politecnico di Milano – Faculty of Architecture, Milan, Italy
 Institut Supérieur d’Architecture La Cambre, Brussels, Belgium
 Technical University Delft - Dept. of Architecture, Delft, Holland
 University of Lagos – Dept. of Architecture, Lagos, Nigeria
 Berlage Institute, Amsterdam, Holland
 Akademie voor Bouwkunst, Arnhem, Holland
 Akademie voor Bouwkunst,  Tilburg, Holland
 KU Leuven - Sint Lucas Architectuur, Brussels, Belgium
 KU Leuven - Sint Lucas Architectuur, Gent, Belgium

Publications 
 Matteo Galiazzo, Ola-Dele Kuku Antwerpen : ABC2004, 2005. 
 L’Arca n° 51 – ‘L’Utopia del Progetto’ by Mautizio Vitta, (Milan, Italy 1991).
 Arch and Life n° 69 – ‘Opera Domestica 1’ by Marc Gossé (Brussels, Belgium 1995).
 Noc n° 26 – ‘In the beginning’ by Julia Chiu (Nagoya, Japan 1996).
 L’Arca n° 112 – ‘Opera Domestica’ by Maurizio Vitta (Milan, Italy 1997).
 Kwintessens n° 1 – ‘Ola-Dele Kuku’ Profile by Christian Oosterlinck (Brussels, Belgium 1997).
 De Morgan – January ‘De betonnen bonker van Noah’ by Farida O’Seery (Brussels, Belgium 1997).
 Knack n° 47 – ‘Kasten als Kathedralen’ by Jean-Pierre Gabriel (Brussels, Belgium 1997).
 Knack n° 13 – ‘Dromen Van Een Kerkhof’ by Max Borka (Brussels, Belgium 1998).
 Trends n° 46 – ‘Leegte is de Drijfreer’ by Margot Vanderstraeten (Brussels, Belgium 1998).
 Revue Noir n° 30 – ‘Nigeria’ Ola-Dele Kuku Profile (Paris, France 1998).
 Feeling Wonen n° 09/0015 – ‘Sculpturen vol geheimen’ by Hilde Bouchez (Brussels, Belgium 1999).
 Revue Noir n° 31 – ‘Project de Ville’ Ola-Dele Kuku Profile ( Paris, France 1999).
 Vernissage n° 1/7 – ‘Ola-Dele Kuku’ by Mia Dekeersemaker (Amsterdam, The Netherlands 2000).
 Object n° 16 – ‘Diptych’ by Hans Fonck (Amsterdam, The Netherlands 2000).
 Passion Architecture n° 9 – ‘L’architecture au-delà frontières’ (Paris, France 2004).
 Trends n° 20 – ‘Het denkende design van Ola-Dele Kuku’ by Sérge Vanmaercke (Brussels, Belgium 2004).
 Trends n° 20 – ‘Le no nonsense d’un Yoruba à Bruxelles’ by Sérge Vanmaercke (Brussels, Belgium 2004).
 Luxos n° 5 – ‘I pezzi unici dell’architetto Ola-Dele Kuku’ by Alessia Franchini (Milan, Italy 2005).
 U Magazine n° 042 – ‘Ola-Dele Kuku’ U profile (Hong Kong, China 2006).
 Area Revue n° 16 – ‘Desseins de structures urbaines’ by Alexandre Mensah (Paris, France 2008).
 Nubian's Magazine n° 7 – ‘La dialectique de l’ordre et du chaos’ by Roger Ndéma Kingué (Brussels, Belgium 2010)
 Kwintessens Magazine n° 2 – ‘Ontwerpen voor Conflict en Chaos’ interview by Kurt Vanbelleghem (Brussels, Belgium 2011)
 ‘Speaking in Vernacular’ (Ola-Dele Kuku monograph), – Texts by Sara Weyns, F. Kehinde Oluyadi, Chika Unigwe, and Roger Ndéma Kingué (Brussels, Belgium, 2012)
 `The Saga Continues’ (Ola-Dele Kuku monograph), - Text by Sara Weyns (Antwerp, Belgium, 2013)
 `7th Flanders Design Triennial‘, (Conflict and Design) - ‘Agenda Setting’ (the running mean) - interview by Elien Haentjens (Genk, Belgium, 2013)
 `7th Flanders Design Triennial‘, (Conflict and Design) - ‘Conflict Culture’ - Text by Ola-Dele Kuku (Genk, Belgium, 2013)

See also 
 Contemporary African Art
 List of Nigerian architects

References

External links 
 
 

1963 births
Living people
Architects from Lagos
Nigerian artists
Yoruba artists
Yoruba architects
Yoruba academics
Southern California Institute of Architecture alumni
Nigerian expatriates in Italy
Nigerian expatriates in Belgium
Academic staff of the Delft University of Technology
20th-century Nigerian architects
21st-century Nigerian architects
Academic staff of the University of Lagos